"Go Home" is a song by Stevie Wonder, released as the second single from his twentieth studio album, In Square Circle (1985). The song showcased the narrator's plea to a young woman to go home, though the girl tries to get the narrator to stay with her. In the US, the song peaked at #2 on the Billboard R&B chart and #10 on the Billboard Hot 100 and, to date, is Wonder's last song to reach the US top ten on the Hot 100. "Go Home" also topped both the Billboard dance chart and the Billboard Adult Contemporary chart.

Stevie performed this song as early as the May 7, 1983, episode of Saturday Night Live and nearly two years later at the 1985 Grammy Awards ceremony in Los Angeles, California, in a synthesizer jam with other contemporaries Howard Jones, Herbie Hancock, and Thomas Dolby.  Like "Part-Time Lover," the song was released with a special 12-inch version, which demonstrated Wonder's ability to reverse-sample.

Billboard called it a "darker follow up" to "Part-Time Lover" that is "more subtle and affecting."

Personnel
 Stevie Wonder – lead vocal, background vocal, synthesizers, drums, vocoder
 Bob Malach – saxophone
 Larry Gittens - trumpet

Charts

Weekly charts

Year-end charts

Cover versions
Instrumental group Groovopolis, led by guitarist Chris Cortez, covered the song for their self-titled first and only album in 2002.

See also
List of number-one dance singles of 1986 (U.S.)
List of number-one adult contemporary singles of 1986 (U.S.)

References

1985 singles
Stevie Wonder songs
Songs written by Stevie Wonder
1985 songs
Tamla Records singles
Song recordings produced by Stevie Wonder